Dorthe may refer to:

Dorthe Binkert (born 1949), German novelist and non-fiction writer
Dorthe Dahl-Jensen (born 1958), Danish palaeoclimatology professor and researcher
Dorthe Engelbrechtsdatter (1634–1716), Norwegian author
Dorthe Hansen, Danish orienteering competitor
Dorthe Holm (born 1972), Danish curler from Kastrup
Dorthe Hoppius (born 1996), German footballer
Dorthe Kristoffersen (1906–1976), Greenlandic artist 
Dorthe Jørgensen (born 1959), Danish philosopher, theologian, historian of ideas
Dorthe Larsen (born 1969), Danish football goalkeeper
Anne Dorthe Lund (died 1759), Danish stage actress
Dorthe Nors (born 1970), Danish writer
Dorthe Pedersen (born 1977), Danish rower
Dorthe Rasmussen (born 1960), long-distance runner from Denmark
Dorthe Skappel (born 1962), Norwegian television personality
Anne Dorthe Tanderup (born 1972), Danish team handball player, Olympic champion, World Champion
Dorthe Wolfsberg (born 1958), retired Danish sprinter

See also
Dorte (name)
Castets-en-Dorthe, former commune in the Gironde department in Nouvelle-Aquitaine in southwestern France
Dorothy (disambiguation) 
Dorothée
Dorth
Dourthe
Dörth